David Lee Hobson (born October 17, 1936) is an American lawyer and politician of the Republican Party who served as a U.S. representative from the seventh congressional district of Ohio from 1991 to 2009.

Early life and education
Hobson was born in Cincinnati, Ohio and graduated from Withrow High School in 1954. He received a Bachelor of Arts degree from Ohio Wesleyan University (Delaware, Ohio) in 1958 and a law degree from Ohio State University (Columbus, Ohio) in 1963. He served in the Ohio Air National Guard from 1958 to 1963. Hobson served as an Ohio state senator from 1982 to 1990, serving as President of the Ohio Senate from 1988 to 1990.    Hobson was responsible for Ohio's first AIDS law, significant improvements at the state level with regard to mental illness and its treatment, and all of the significant health legislation during his service in the Senate.

Congress
In 1990, after Mike DeWine left his seat in the U.S. House of Representatives to become Lieutenant Governor of Ohio, Hobson was elected to replace him. It was the second time Hobson had succeeded DeWine; he'd followed DeWine into the Ohio Senate. Hobson began serving in the House in 1991 (102nd Congress), and was reelected eight times without serious difficulty. Hobson was the assistant majority whip for the 110th Congress. Hobson is a member of the Republican Main Street Partnership and is considered to be a moderate Republican.

As a congressman, some of Hobson's primary concerns were improving health care, controlling government spending and balancing the budget, and strengthening national security. Hobson also believed that Congress must help to stimulate the economies of former industrial towns who have seen factories leave.

Controversies 
In October 2006, the Wall Street Journal reported that Hobson led a delegation to Normandy, France in August 2004 for the groundbreaking of an "interpretive center" at a cemetery for American soldiers killed during World War II. During the seven-day trip, the delegation was feted with at least two private restaurant dinners, one given by Northrop and another by the PMA Group, a leading lobbyist for defense companies. On a 2005 trip to visit nuclear-fuel processing plants in France, Hobson and his delegation attended a dinner near Avignon, in southern France, hosted by Areva SA, the world's largest maker of nuclear reactors. Because House rules prohibit members from accepting any gifts worth $50 or more, the article cited the opinions of “experts” on congressional ethics who speculated that the trip may have violated House rules and possibly federal law. However, no legal or ethics charges were brought forward and no impropriety was alleged by either legal or congressional ethics officials. 

On October 14, 2007, Hobson announced that he would retire at the end of his term in 2009.

Committee assignments
 Appropriations Committee
 Subcommittee on Defense
 Subcommittee on Energy and Water Development (Ranking Member)
 Subcommittee on Military Construction (Chair)

See also
 List of United States representatives from Ohio

Footnotes

External links
 U.S. Congressman Dave Hobson, U.S. House site
 David Hobson's statements
 
 

1936 births
Living people
Republican Party Ohio state senators
Politicians from Cincinnati
Ohio Wesleyan University alumni
Ohio State University Moritz College of Law alumni
20th-century American military personnel
21st-century American politicians
American United Methodists
Republican Party members of the United States House of Representatives from Ohio
Ohio National Guard personnel
Members of Congress who became lobbyists